A Farewell to Arms is an occasional sonnet written by George Peele. It is the coda of Peele's Polyhymnia, written for the Accession Day tilt of 1590.  The prior thirteen parts of Polyhymnia are each blank verse descriptions of pairs of contestants with vague impressions of their combat, though Peele does not name the victors. A Farewell to Arms then commemorates the tenure and retirement of Sir Henry Lee as the Queen's Champion. Lee had been the Queen's Champion since the first Accession Day tilts, possibly as early as 1559. In 1590 the position passed to the Earl of Cumberland.

Content

References 

Sonnets
Poetry
Elizabethan era